Martina Soto Pose is an Argentine newsreporter.

Awards

Nominations
 2013 Martín Fierro Awards
 Best news reporter

References

Argentine women journalists
Living people
Year of birth missing (living people)